Chicago Med is an American medical drama television series created by Dick Wolf and Matt Olmstead, and is the third installment of Wolf Entertainment's Chicago franchise. The series premiered on NBC on November 17, 2015. Chicago Med follows the emergency department (ED) doctors and nurses of the fictional Gaffney Chicago Medical Center.

On February 27, 2020, NBC renewed the series for a sixth, seventh, and eighth season. The sixth season premiered on November 11, 2020. The seventh season premiered on September 22, 2021. The eighth season premiered on September 21, 2022.

Premise
Set in Chicago, Chicago Med is the third series in Dick Wolf's Chicago franchise. It focuses on the emergency department at Gaffney Chicago Medical Center and on its doctors and nurses as they work to save patients' lives. It sometimes crosses over with characters from Chicago Fire and Chicago P.D.

Cast

Main

 Nick Gehlfuss as Dr. Will Halstead (seasons 1 – present), a former plastic surgeon, who at the start of the series becomes an ED supervising attending physician. He is originally from Chicago and is the older brother of Chicago P.D. character Detective Jay Halstead. He was engaged to Dr. Natalie Manning from seasons three to four.
 Yaya DaCosta as April Sexton (seasons 1–6; recurring season 8), a first-generation Brazilian-American ED nurse. She has a younger brother, Noah, who began as a third-year medical student at the hospital. She is also a childhood friend of Chicago Fire character Lieutenant Kelly Severide. In the sixth season, she applies and gets accepted into a nurse practitioner program in order to do more in caring for patients and in the seventh-season premiere "You Can't Always Trust What You See", it is revealed that she has started the program. She later returns in the eighth season after completing the program. She and Dr. Ethan Choi rekindle their relationship during this time, and marry in the middle of the season, with the intent of starting a mobile clinic for the impoverished people in the community.
 Torrey DeVitto as Dr. Natalie Manning (seasons 1–7), an ED pediatrician who did a fellowship in emergency medicine in the first season and becomes an attending in the emergency pediatrics division in the fifth season. She is a widow, coping with the loss of her husband, Jeff, who was killed in action while serving in the U.S. military. In the first-season episode "Bound", she gives birth to her son Owen. In the seventh-season premiere "You Can't Always Trust What You See", she is fired by Sharon Goodwin and moves back to Seattle with Owen after admitting that she stole drugs from her ex-fiancé Dr. Will Halstead's trial for her sick mother.
 Rachel DiPillo as Dr. Sarah Reese (seasons 1–3; guest season 4), originally a fourth-year medical student, who does not feel inclined to emergency medicine, and would rather become a pathologist. After she graduates from medical school, she changes her mind about being a pathologist and becomes a resident in psychiatry. In the fourth-season premiere "Be My Better Half", she transfers from Chicago Med to Baylor after Dr. Daniel Charles finds out her father is a suspected serial killer and they have a falling out.
 Colin Donnell as Dr. Connor Rhodes (seasons 1–5), a cardio-thoracic fellow from Chicago, who spent some time in Riyadh following his residency. In the first season, he is a trauma surgery fellow, but switches his specialty to cardio-thoracic. In the fifth-season premiere "Never Going Back to Normal", he leaves Med, and Chicago completely for a fresh start after the deaths of his father Cornelius Rhodes and his rival and ex-girlfriend Dr. Ava Bekker, who committed suicide after murdering Cornelius to win Connor back.
He marries April Sexton in the middle of the eighth season and leaves Chicago Med afterwards to start a mobile clinic for the impoverished people in the community with her.
 S. Epatha Merkerson as Sharon Goodwin (seasons 1 – present), a former OR nurse and the Chief of Patient and Medical Services (chief administrator) of Gaffney Chicago Medical Center.
 Oliver Platt as Dr. Daniel Charles (seasons 1 – present), the chief of the psychiatry department, who is usually tasked with helping the other doctors deal with the psychological nuances of medicine or difficult patients. He is a graduate of the University of Pennsylvania.
 Marlyne Barrett as Maggie Lockwood (season 1 – present), the ED's charge nurse who is not afraid to speak her mind when it comes to schooling the residents. In the fifth season, she is diagnosed with metastatic breast cancer, but is later cured and she marries former cancer patient Ben Campbell.
 Norma Kuhling as Dr. Ava Bekker (seasons 3–5; recurring season 2), a South African trauma surgeon. She butts heads with Dr. Connor Rhodes on professional boundaries, and eventually their rivalry becomes a romantic relationship, which eventually ends after Connor's father alleges that Ava seduced and slept with him to persuade him to fund Connor's hybrid OR. In the fourth-season finale "With a Brave Heart", Connor turns her down in reconciling their relationship and then suspects her of killing his father. In the fifth-season premiere "Never Going Back to Normal", she commits suicide after admitting to killing Connor's father in a last-ditch effort to win him back.
 Dominic Rains as Dr. Crockett Marcel (season 5 – present), a new trauma surgeon fellow at Chicago Med.
 Steven Weber as Dr. Dean Archer (season 7 – present; recurring season 6), an experienced trauma surgeon and emergency physician and a mentor to Dr. Ethan Choi having formerly served in the Navy together.
 Guy Lockard as Dr. Dylan Scott (seasons 7–8), a new ED pediatrician. He is a former Chicago police officer, who switched his career to medicine. In the eighth-season premiere "How Do You Begin to Count the Losses?", after the death of his lover Jo, an undercover cop whom he had crossed paths multiple times with during her assignment, he realizes that he will never be able to let go of his past as a police officer as long as he remains in Chicago and leaves Med, and the city altogether for a new start.
 Kristen Hager as Dr. Stevie Hammer (season 7), a new attending physician, who has a past with Dr. Will Halstead. After many ups and downs in dealing with her homeless, addicted, and mentally-ill mother, she moves back to Michigan halfway through the seventh season to give her marriage another chance.
 Jessy Schram as Dr. Hannah Asher (season 7 – present; recurring seasons 5–6), a returning physician from Los Angeles who previously struggled with substance abuse before getting sober.

Recurring
 Julie Berman as Dr. Samantha "Sam" Zanetti (season 1), an attending trauma surgeon who briefly dates Dr. Connor Rhodes
 Deron J. Powell as Tate Jenkins (seasons 1–2), a retired NFL player who begins dating Nurse April Sexton when she helps treat his son in season one. They become engaged in season two, but break it off shortly after she is infected with tuberculosis and miscarries their child.
 Jeremy Shouldis as Dr. Marty Peterson (season 1–present), an anesthesiologist with a silky, deep voice. 
 Peter Mark Kendall as Joey Thomas, a lab tech who dates Dr. Sarah Reese in seasons one and two.
 Roland Buck III as Dr. Noah Sexton (seasons 1–6; guest season 8), a first-year ED resident and Nurse April Sexton's younger brother. In the sixth-season episode "When Your Heart Rules Your Head", he is fired by Dr. Ethan Choi for negligence, due to assisting in Dr. James Coleman's suicide, and he leaves Chicago to take over Dr. Coleman's clinic in Atlanta. He later returns in the eighth season for April and Ethan's wedding.
 Brennan Brown as Dr. Sam Abrams, a blunt attending neurosurgeon.
 Gregg Henry as Dr. David Downey (season 1), a high-profile heart surgeon who takes an interest in Dr. Connor Rhodes, and dies of cancer in the first-season finale "Timing".
 D. W. Moffett as Cornelius Rhodes (seasons 1–4), the father of Dr. Connor Rhodes. He runs the family business Dolen Rhodes, a high-end department store started by his father. Connor's choice to go into medicine lead to a bitter estrangement between father and son. He is murdered by Dr. Ava Bekker, Dr. Rhodes' ex-girlfriend, via insulin overdose in fourth-season episode "Forever Hold Your Peace" in an attempt to win Dr. Rhodes back, which is revealed later in the fifth-season premiere "Never Going Back to Normal", resulting in Dr. Bekker's suicide.
 Christina Brucato as Claire Rhodes (season 1), the sister of Dr. Connor Rhodes.
 Lorena Diaz as Nurse Doris (season 1–present), ED nurse.
 Casey Tutton as Nurse Monique (season 2–5), ED nurse.
 Marie Tredway as Nurse Trini (season 5-present), ED nurse.
 Amanda Marcheschi as Nurse Dina (season 1-present), ICU charge nurse, sometimes assists in surgical ward.
 Jeff Hephner as Jeff Clarke (seasons 1–2), a medical student, a former Marine and Iraq veteran, and Dr. Natalie Manning's old family friend. Clarke was briefly a firefighter at Firehouse 51 before returning to medical school after an injury. Clarke briefly dates Natalie until he confesses that her late husband did not approve of his feelings for her. Clarke matches with a hospital in Honolulu, Hawaii, after graduating from medical school.
 Ato Essandoh as Dr. Isidore Latham (season 2–present), the attending cardio-thoracic surgeon who supervises Dr. Connor Rhodes' fellowship after Dr. Downey's death from seasons two to five when Connor leaves Chicago Med. Latham has autism spectrum disorder, which sometimes makes it difficult for him to understand the emotional responses of the medical staff.
 Mekia Cox as Dr. Robin Charles (seasons 2–5), an epidemiologist and Dr. Daniel Charles' previously estranged daughter. She dates Dr. Connor Rhodes from seasons two to three.
 Eddie Jemison as Dr. Stanley Stohl (seasons 2–4), the chief of the emergency department, derisively referred to as "The Troll" by the staff because of his condescending and publicity-courting ways. He is fired from Chicago Med after an arbitrary decision by Gaffney Chicago Medical Center's COO.
 Alexandra Grey as Denise Lockwood (season 2–present), Nurse Maggie Lockwood's transgender sister.
 James Vincent Meredith as Barry (season 3), a paramedic who is Nurse Maggie Lockwood's on-again/off-again ex-boyfriend.
 Nate Santana as Dr. James Lanik (season 3–present), Chief of Trauma Surgery, formerly the interim head of the Emergency Department. 
 Michel Gill as Robert Haywood (seasons 3–4), Dr. Sarah Reese's estranged father who was an astrophysics professor and a suspected serial killer.
 Arden Cho as Emily Choi (seasons 3–4), Dr. Ethan Choi's younger and previously estranged recovering–drug addict sister
 Molly Bernard as Dr. Elsa Curry (season 4–5), a first-year ED resident who ends up working closely with Dr. Daniel Charles.
 Ian Harding as Phillip Davis (seasons 4–5), a widowed father who is left to raise his daughter alone after his wife dies from an aneurysm in childbirth. He dates Dr. Natalie Manning from seasons four to five.
 Jodi Kingsley as DCFS Officer Madeline Gastern (season 1-present), a Department of Child and Family Services social worker attached to Gaffney Medical Center
 Tehmina Sunny as Dr. Sabeena Virani (season 6), a cardiologist who supervises a clinical trial for a new medication and approaches Dr. Will Halstead to lead the project.
 Asjha Cooper as Dr. Vanessa Taylor (season 6–present) is a first year resident, who initially had friction with Maggie due to her being her biological mother and she doesn't want anyone to know.
 Sarah Rafferty as Dr. Pamela Blake (season 7), is a transplant surgeon who has friction with Dr. Marcel after he did not want her daughter to be operated on.
 Bonita Friedericy as Terri Hammer (season 7), is the mother of Dr. Hammer.
 Michael Rady as Dr. Matt Cooper (season 7), is a doctor who uses Vas-com a lot and who Will is investigating to find out if he is doing illegal use in the hospital.
 Johanna Braddy as Avery Quinn (season 7) is the daughter of Dr. Pamela Blake who has an interest in Dr. Marcel.

Episodes

Crossovers

 "The Beating Heart" (Chicago Fire Season 4, Episode 10) / "Now I'm God" (Chicago P.D. Season 3, Episode 10) – In the first crossover with Fire and P.D., continuing on "Malignant", a member of Firehouse 51 is rushed to Chicago Med for a stabbing while an attempted suicide uncovers four cases of chemo overdose, leading to an investigation that becomes personal for Voight.
 "Going to War" (Chicago Fire Season 7, Episode 2) / "Endings" (Chicago P.D. Season 6, Episode 2) – In the second crossover with Fire and P.D., continuing on "When to Let Go", the victims of an apartment complex fire are rushed into Chicago Med and Intelligence races to find the culprit.
 "Infection" (Chicago Fire Season 8, Episode 4/Chicago Med Season 5, Episode 4/Chicago P.D. Season 7, Episode 4) – In the third crossover with Fire and P.D., a bioterrorist spreads a deadly virus throughout Chicago.

Production

Development
The series was greenlighted by NBC for the show's pilot episode on May 1, 2015.

On August 21, 2015, Andrew Dettman stepped down as showrunner due to "creative differences" following his appointment in June. Andrew Schneider and Diane Frolov were appointed as new showrunners on August 27, 2015.

NBC originally ordered 13 episodes for season one; on December 11, 2015, an additional 5 episodes were ordered, bringing the season to 18 episodes.

On February 1, 2016, NBC renewed the series for a second season.  On May 15, 2016, it was announced that the series would be moving to Thursdays. The second season premiered on September 22, 2016.

On May 10, 2017, NBC renewed the series for a third season but opted to remove it from the fall schedule to midseason, after the premiere of Dick Wolf's sixth Law & Order series Law & Order True Crime. The series moved back to Tuesdays after spending one season on Thursdays.

On March 13, 2020, Universal Television shut down production on the series due to the COVID-19 pandemic.

Casting
The Walking Dead star Laurie Holden was originally cast as Dr. Hannah Tramble, but dropped out due to "family reasons". On May 29, 2015, Arrow star Colin Donnell was cast as Dr. Connor Rhodes, the hospital's newest trauma surgeon. In July 2015, Jurassic World star Brian Tee joined the cast as Dr. Ethan Choi, an expert in infectious disease prevention and a Navy Reserve medical officer. Pretty Little Liars star Torrey DeVitto was cast on August 13, 2015, as Dr. Natalie Manning, the ED pediatrician. On August 14, 2015, Jane the Virgin star Rachel DiPillo was cast as Sarah Reese, a fourth-year medical student.

On April 19, 2019, NBC announced that original cast member Colin Donnell and Norma Kuhling would be written out of the series at the end of the fourth season for creative reasons. On May 12, 2021, NBC announced that original cast members Yaya DaCosta and Torrey DeVitto would leave the series at the end of the sixth season after deciding not to renew their contracts to pursue new roles. On July 21, 2021, it was announced that Steven Weber would be promoted to a series regular after recurring in the sixth season, and Guy Lockard and Kristen Hager would join the main cast. On October 12, 2022, NBC announced that Tee would leave the series after eight seasons.

Reception

Ratings

Reviews
On Metacritic, season 1 has a weighted average score of 52 out of 100 based on 17 reviews, indicating "mixed or average" reviews. Rotten Tomatoes reported that 50% of critics have given the season 1 of the show a positive review based on 26 reviews, with an average rating of 5.52/10. The site's critics consensus reads, "While adding nothing new to the established medical procedural formula, Dick Wolf's Chicago Med hits its familiar beats forcefully enough to satisfy a few genre enthusiasts."

Broadcast and streaming
Chicago Med airs on NBC and is available through the network's streaming platforms, on demand and Hulu with previous season "stacking rights" on the former, and pay-per-episode purchase via electronic sell-through platforms. The series will be available for streaming on Peacock along with Chicago Fire, Chicago P.D., Law & Order, Law & Order: Special Victims Unit and Law & Order: Criminal Intent.

In Canada, the series aired on the Global Television Network for four seasons, then moved to CityTV. Season three aired at the start of the week ahead of the NBC air date later in the week.

In Malaysia, the series aired on PRIMEtime for five seasons, then moved to Sony Channel Asia.

In the UK, Chicago Med premiered on March 20, 2016, on Universal Channel in the United Kingdom and Ireland. The second season aired on October 23, 2016. Since the fifth season, it has aired on Sky Witness.

In Australia, the series debuted on November 23, 2016, on the Nine Network.

In Romania, the series debuted on February 16, 2017, on the channel Diva under the title "Camera de gardă" (The guard room). The sixth season premiered on March 7, 2021.

Awards

References

Notes

External links
 
 
  on Wolf Entertainment
  on NBC
 
 
 

 
Chicago (franchise)
2015 American television series debuts
2010s American drama television series
2020s American drama television series
2010s American medical television series
2010s American workplace drama television series
2020s American medical television series
2020s American workplace drama television series
American television spin-offs
Television series by Universal Television
Television series by Wolf Films
Television shows set in Chicago
Television shows set in Illinois
Television shows featuring audio description
Fictional hospitals